|}

This is a list of electoral district results for the Victorian 1961 election.

Results by electoral district

Albert Park 

The two candidate preferred vote was not counted between the Labor and DLP candidates for Albert Park.

Ballarat North

Ballarat South

Balwyn

Benalla

Benambra

Bendigo

Box Hill

Brighton

Broadmeadows

Brunswick East 

 The two candidate preferred vote was not counted between the Labor and DLP candidates for Brunswick East.

Brunswick West 

 The two candidate preferred vote was not counted between the Labor and DLP candidates for Brunswick West.

Burwood

Camberwell

Caulfield

Coburg 

 The two candidate preferred vote was not counted between the Labor and DLP candidates for Coburg.

Dandenong

Dundas

Elsternwick

Essendon

Evelyn

Fitzroy 

The two candidate preferred vote was not counted between the Labor and DLP candidates for Fitzroy.

Flemington

Footscray 

The two candidate preferred vote was not counted between the Labor and DLP candidates for Footscray.

Geelong

Geelong West

Gippsland East

Gippsland South

Gippsland West

Grant 

The two candidate preferred vote was not counted between the Labor and DLP candidates for Grant.

Hampden

Hawthorn

Ivanhoe

Kara Kara

Kew

Lowan

Malvern

Melbourne

Mentone

Midlands

Mildura

Moonee Ponds

Moorabbin

Mornington

Morwell

Mulgrave

Murray Valley

Northcote 

 The two candidate preferred vote was not counted between the Labor and DLP candidates for Northcote.

Oakleigh

Ormond

Polwarth

Portland

Prahran

Preston 

 The two candidate preferred vote was not counted between the Labor and DLP candidates for Preston.

Reservoir 

 The two candidate preferred vote was not counted between the Labor and DLP candidates for Reservoir.

Richmond 

 The two candidate preferred vote was not counted between the Labor and DLP candidates for Richmond.

Ringwood

Ripponlea

Rodney

St Kilda

Sandringham

Scoresby

Swan Hill

Toorak

Williamstown 

 The two candidate preferred vote was not counted between the Labor and DLP candidates for Williamstown.

Yarraville 

 The two candidate preferred vote was not counted between the Labor and DLP candidates for Yarraville.

See also 

 1961 Victorian state election
 Members of the Victorian Legislative Assembly, 1961–1964

References 

Results of Victorian state elections
1960s in Victoria (Australia)